Oombabeer is a rural locality in the Central Highlands Region, Queensland, Australia.

Road infrastructure
The Fitzroy Developmental Road follows the western boundary, cutting through the western extremity for a short distance. The Dawson Highway runs along most of the southern boundary.

References 

Central Highlands Region
Localities in Queensland